Petter Solli (born 22 April 1966) is a retired Norwegian football defender.

Hailing from Ørnes, he played ten seasons for FK Bodø/Glimt and became cup champion in 1993.

He spent the years 1996 and 1997 in Moss FK, then 1998 and 1999 in Sweden's Trelleborgs FF. In 2000 he became player-manager of FK Lofoten, continuing as such in Svolvær IL from 2006.

References

1966 births
Living people
People from Meløy
Norwegian footballers
FK Bodø/Glimt players
Moss FK players
Trelleborgs FF players
FK Lofoten players
Norwegian First Division players
Eliteserien players
Allsvenskan players
Norwegian expatriate footballers
Expatriate footballers in Sweden
Norwegian expatriate sportspeople in Sweden
Association football defenders
Norwegian football managers
Sportspeople from Nordland